Death of Dragut is an oil painting by the Maltese artist Giuseppe Calì, from 1867. It depicts the death of the Ottoman general Dragut during the Great Siege of Malta in 1565.

Description
It measures 225 x 170 cm, and is in the collection of MUŻA in Valletta, Malta.

Analysis
The painting was Calì's signature work. It depicts the episode during the Great Siege of Malta, when the Commander Dragut was fatally wounded. 
During bombardment of Fort St. Elmo, in June 1565, a shot from Fort St. Angelo, across the Grand Harbour, struck the ground close to the Turkish battery. However, conflicting views exist which hold that the fatal siege fire originated from within the Ottoman Encampment.

The painting shows the influence of Domenico Morelli, and Eugène Delacroix. 
It was painted in 1867, on Cali's return to Malta after his two years in Naples.
It was bought by the Government.

References

1867 paintings
Paintings in Malta
Maltese paintings
War paintings
Paintings about death
Paintings of people
Cultural depictions of Turkish men
Cultural depictions of military officers